Patrick Ndayisenga (born 28 October 1971) is a Burundian athlete who specialized in the marathon and long-distance running

Ndayisenga competed at the 2000 Summer Olympics in Sydney when he entered the marathon, but he didn't finish the race. He twice competed at the IAAF World Cross Country Championships with his best finish being 19th at the 1998 IAAF World Cross Country Championships.

References

1971 births
Living people
Burundian male long-distance runners
Athletes (track and field) at the 2000 Summer Olympics
Olympic athletes of Burundi
Burundian male marathon runners
20th-century Burundian people
21st-century Burundian people